is a Japanese feminine given name.

Possible writings
 和, "harmony"
 暖, "warmth"
 円, "circle"
 和香, "harmony, aroma"

People
, Japanese softball player

Fictional characters
 , a character from Saki
 , a character from K-On!
 , a character from Negima! Magister Negi Magi
 , a character from Ranma ½
, a character from Healin' Good Pretty Cure

See also
Nodoka, a theme for the GNOME desktop environment  provided as part of the Fedora Linux  distribution

Japanese feminine given names